Franklin Dewey Richards (November 17, 1900 – November 13, 1987) was a national commissioner of the United States Federal Housing Administration (FHA) and a general authority of the Church of Jesus Christ of Latter-day Saints (LDS Church).

Richards was born in Ogden, Utah to Charles C. Richards and Louisa L. Peery. He was the youngest of eight children. He was named after his paternal grandfather, who was a member of the LDS Church's Quorum of the Twelve Apostles from 1849 to 1899. Richards was married to Helen Kearnes and was the father of four children.

From 1920 to 1922, Richards was an LDS Church missionary in the Eastern States Mission. During his mission, he was the president of the New York, Boston, and Brooklyn districts.

In 1923, Richards received a Bachelor of Laws degree from the University of Utah. He practiced law in Salt Lake City until being named as the first Utah director of the FHA. In 1947, he became the national commissioner of the FHA in Washington, D.C. Richards resigned this position in 1952 and pursued a career in mortgage banking.

Prior to his call as a general authority, Richards served in the LDS Church as president of the Northwestern States Mission. In 1960, he became an Assistant to the Quorum of the Twelve Apostles. He served in this capacity until 1976, when the position was discontinued. At this time, he became a member of the newly constituted First Quorum of the Seventy and the senior president of the Presidency of the Seventy. In 1983, he was released from the Presidency of the Seventy to serve as the president of the Washington D.C. Temple; he served in this position until 1986.

Richards died at home in Salt Lake City and his funeral was held in the Salt Lake Assembly Hall on what would have been his 87th birthday. The speakers at his funeral included LDS Church apostles Gordon B. Hinckley, Thomas S. Monson, Marvin J. Ashton, and Richard G. Scott.

Richards was credited with creating the six-part missionary discussions which were used by the LDS Church for many years.

Notes

References
"Elder Franklin D. Richards Eulogized," Ensign, January 1988, p. 74

External links
Grampa Bill's G.A. Pages: Franklin D. Richards
"Opportunities to Serve," Ensign, November 1987, p. 81 : Richards's last public sermon

1900 births
1987 deaths
20th-century Mormon missionaries
American general authorities (LDS Church)
American Mormon missionaries in the United States
Assistants to the Quorum of the Twelve Apostles
Heads of United States federal agencies
Members of the First Quorum of the Seventy (LDS Church)
Mission presidents (LDS Church)
People from Ogden, Utah
Presidents of the Seventy (LDS Church)
Richards–Young family
Temple presidents and matrons (LDS Church)
University of Utah alumni
Utah lawyers
20th-century American lawyers
Latter Day Saints from Utah
Latter Day Saints from Washington, D.C.